The women's 100 metre backstroke event at the 1960 Olympic Games took place between September 1 and 3. This swimming event used backstroke.  Because an Olympic-size swimming pool is 50 metres long, this race consisted of two lengths of the pool.

Medalists

Results

Heats
Eight fastest swimmers from the heats advanced to the finals.

Heat 1

Heat 2

Heat 3

Heat 4

Final

Key: OR = Olympic record

References

External links
Women 100m Backstroke Swimming Olympic Games 1960 Roma (ITA), retrieved 2013-12-30

Women's backstroke 100 metre
1960 in women's swimming
Women's events at the 1960 Summer Olympics